Soletellina nitida, commonly known as the shining sunset shell, is a bivalve mollusc of the family Psammobiidae.

References
 Powell A. W. B., New Zealand Mollusca, William Collins Publishers Ltd, Auckland, New Zealand 1979 

Psammobiidae
Bivalves of New Zealand
Bivalves described in 1835